Osborne Henry Douglas (14 March 1880 – 24 April 1918) was an Australian cricketer. He played seven first-class matches for Tasmania between 1898 and 1905. He was killed in action during World War I.

See also
 List of Tasmanian representative cricketers
 List of cricketers who were killed during military service

References

External links
 
 

1880 births
1918 deaths
Australian cricketers
Australian military personnel killed in World War I
Cricketers from Launceston, Tasmania
Tasmania cricketers
Military personnel from Tasmania
Australian Army soldiers